Joan Lader is an American vocal coach and voice therapist. She is known for her work with elite performers and recording artists as well as for the rehabilitation of injured voices. Lader received the 2016 Tony Honors for Excellence in the Theatre in recognition of her contributions to the Broadway community.

Education 

Lader received a B.S. in Theatre and Music from the Pennsylvania State University and an M.A. in Speech Pathology and Audiology from Hunter College. She is a graduate of the High School of Music & Art, now known as the Fiorello H. LaGuardia High School. Lader studied under the voice scientist Jo Estill in New York City and is a certified Master Teacher of the Estill Voice Training system. Her practice is also informed by studies in Alexander Technique, Fitzmaurice Voicework, and the work of Arthur Lessac.

Career 
In the 1970s, Lader performed off-Broadway with the Light Opera of Manhattan. She has maintained a private voice studio in New York City since 1982. She does not disclose her client list. Performers who have publicly referenced or documented their work with Lader include:
 Annaleigh Ashford
 Betty Buckley
 Cynthia Erivo
 Raul Esparza
 Eden Espinosa
 Harvey Fierstein
 Roberta Flack
 Santino Fontana
 Sutton Foster
 Renée Elise Goldsberry
 Anne Hathaway
 Hugh Jackman
 Patti LuPone
 Madonna
 Michael McElroy
 Donna Murphy
 Sting
 Dawn Upshaw
 Frederica von Stade
 Rachel Zegler

In addition, Lader has been a guest lecturer at Columbia University, Yale University, Pace University, Berklee College of Music, and serves on the Musical Theatre Artistic Advisory Committee at Manhattan School of Music and as a consultant for the New Studio at NYU Tisch. She has given presentations and taught workshops for the Voice Foundation in Philadelphia, the New York Singing Teachers’ Association, the Pacific Voice and Speech Foundation in San Francisco, and the National YoungArts Foundation. She worked with the music department on the films Les Miserables and Mary Poppins Returns, and received a “special thanks” credit for the film adaptation of Evita.

Awards 
 2016: Tony Honors for Excellence in Theatre

Books and Media 
 2018 American Theatre Wing video feature, “Working in the Theatre: Vocal Coach.”
 2018 Interview in So You Want to Sing CCM (Contemporary Commercial Music): A Guide for Performers. Matthew Hoch, editor.
 2016 Tony Awards Broadcast: Honors for Excellence in the Theatre acceptance speech.
 2013 Chapter author: “Surviving Eight Shows a Week on Broadway” in The Singer’s Guide to Complete Health. Anthony F. Jahn, editor.
 2010 Interview in Singing in Musical Theatre: The Training of Singers and Actors. Joan Melton, author.

References 

Year of birth missing (living people)
Living people